James Smith was a Scottish footballer who played for clubs including Third Lanark, Clyde, Port Vale, Fulham and Dundee United.

Career
Smith played for Rutherglen Glencairn, Glentoran, Third Lanark, Abercorn (loan), Clydebank (as a guest), Clyde, Dunfermline Athletic (loan), Clackmannan (loan), Inverkeithing United (loan) and Plymouth Argyle, before joining Port Vale in May 1922. He played seven games in the 1922–23 season, and claimed goals against Fulham and Coventry City at Craven Cottage and Highfield Road. He badly twisted a knee during a goalless draw at Clapton Orient on 23 September. His contract was cancelled by mutual consent the next month and he moved on to Fulham.

Personal life 
Smith worked at J.L. Thompson and Sons during the First World War.

Career statistics

References

Footballers from Glasgow
Scottish footballers
Association football forwards
Glentoran F.C. players
Third Lanark A.C. players
Abercorn F.C. players
Clyde F.C. players
Dundee United F.C. players
Dunfermline Athletic F.C. players
Clackmannan F.C. players
Rutherglen Glencairn F.C. players
Plymouth Argyle F.C. players
Port Vale F.C. players
Fulham F.C. players
Scottish Football League players
English Football League players
Year of birth missing
Year of death missing
Scottish Junior Football Association players
NIFL Premiership players